The Courage C36 was a Le Mans Prototype, designed, developed, and built by Courage Compétition team, to compete in sports car racing from 1996 to 1998. It is powered by a   Porsche flat-six engine. Its best result was a 3rd-place finish at the 1997 FIA Sportscar Championship race at Zolder.

Development history
The Courage C36 was the logical further development of the Courage C34, which was successfully used in the 1995 24-hour race at Le Mans. With the C36, the Courage technicians began to replace the wealth of Porsche components previously used with their own designs. The C36 got a new chassis and body, only the 6-cylinder Porsche turbo engine was identical to that of the C34.

Racing history 
For the 1996 24-hour race, Courage gave a C36 to the French racing team La Filière Elf and fielded two works cars itself. The Filière-C36, driven by Henri Pescarolo, Franck Lagorce, and Emmanuel Collard, finished seventh overall and second in the LMP-1 class after 24 hours. One of the two factory C36s, in which Mario Andretti was one of the drivers, finished 13th overall and third in the LMP-1 class.

In 1997, three C36s competed in Le Mans again, although Courage had once again built a new vehicle with the C41. Again the Filière car was the best-placed C36 with a seventh place.

In 1998 only one C36 was running on the Sarthe. Courage had severed its association with Porsche and equipped the new Courage C52 with a Nissan engine. At its last Le Mans appearance, the C36 finished 15th overall.

References

Le Mans Prototypes
24 Hours of Le Mans race cars
Rear-wheel-drive vehicles
Mid-engined cars
Sports prototypes
Cars introduced in 1996
C36
Cars powered by boxer engines